The President of the Region of Murcia, (Spanish: Presidente de la Región de Murcia) is the head of government of the Spanish autonomous community of the Region of Murcia. Since 2014, no person who has been elected to two terms may be elected to a third.

List of Presidents of the Region of Murcia

Pre-autonomous government (1978–1983)
The Regional Council of Murcia (Consejo Regional de Murcia) was the governing body of the Region of Murcia from 1978 until the creation of the autonomous community in 1982. The two Presidents of the Regional Council were Antonio Pérez Crespo and Andrés Hernández Ros.

Autonomous government (1982–present)
The office of the President of the Region of Murcia was created in 1982 upon the creation of the autonomous community.

Sources
Rulers.org: Spain: Autonomous communities

References

 
Region of Murcia